Swiss Political Science Review (SPSR), also known as Schweizerische Zeitschrift für Politikwissenschaft (German), Revue Suisse de Science Politique (French), and Rivista Svizzera di Scienza Politica (Italian) is a quarterly peer-reviewed interdisciplinary academic journal covering political science published by Wiley-Blackwell. The current editors are Prof. Martino Maggetti and Prof. Anke Tresch (University of Lausanne).

Abstracting and indexing 
The journal is abstracted and indexed in:

According to the Journal Citation Reports, the journal has a 2015 impact factor of 1.258, ranking it 48th out of 163 journals in the category "Political Science".

See also 
 List of political science journals

References

External links 
 

Multilingual journals
Political science journals
Publications established in 1995
Quarterly journals
Wiley-Blackwell academic journals
Political science in Switzerland